The fourth Central American Championships in Athletics were held at the Estadio Somoza in Managua, Nicaragua, between March 15-18, 1968.

Participation
Athletes from 6 nations participated in the event.

Medal summary
A couple of results could be retrieved from a variety of articles from the archive of
Costa Rican newspaper La Nación.

Men

Women

Medals
Costa Rica won a total of 22 medals.

Team rankings
Costa Rica came in third in the team ranking of the men's category.  Guatemala
won the team ranking of the women's category with 85 points, Costa Rica came
in second gaining 84.5 points.

References

Central American Championships in Athletics
Central American Championships in Athletics
Central American Championships in Athletics
Central American Championships in Athletics
Sport in Managua
International athletics competitions hosted by Nicaragua